Igor Feldman (born 28 April 1962) is a Kyrgyzstani modern pentathlete. He competed in the men's individual event at the 1996 Summer Olympics.

References

External links
 

1962 births
Living people
Kyrgyzstani male modern pentathletes
Olympic modern pentathletes of Kyrgyzstan
Modern pentathletes at the 1996 Summer Olympics
Place of birth missing (living people)
Asian Games medalists in modern pentathlon
Modern pentathletes at the 1994 Asian Games
Asian Games bronze medalists for Kyrgyzstan
Medalists at the 1994 Asian Games
20th-century Kyrgyzstani people
21st-century Kyrgyzstani people